Alexander Koptsev (born 1985) is a Russian-born terrorist. On January 11, 2006, Kopstev burst into Bolshaya Bronnaya Synagogue in Moscow, Russia during evening prayers and stabbed eight people with a hunting knife before being wrestled to the ground by the  congregation's leader, Rabbi Yitzhak Kogan, and his son Yosef Kogan. Four of those injured were in serious condition. On January 13, 2006, Koptsev was charged with racially motivated attempted murder and humiliation of a religious group. He has been described by Russian media as a racist skinhead.

After the incident, Russia's Chief Rabbi Berl Lazar announced he was cutting short a visit to Israel to return to Moscow. Lazar stated that the attack was a symptom of a general climate of intolerance and xenophobia in Russia. Rabbi Kogan and his son were later awarded a medal of bravery by President Vladimir Putin.

On February 28, 2006, Koptsev pleaded not guilty of attempting to murder Jewish worshipers at a synagogue. The official charge against him was attempted murder "motivated by racial hatred", a charge that is rarely brought in Russian courts. Investigators found anti-semitic pamphlets in his home, but insist that he was acting alone. He has been diagnosed with a schizophrenic disorder, but prosecutors said he was still fit to stand trial.

On March 27, 2006, Koptsev was sentenced to 13 years in prison and mandatory psychiatric treatment after being found guilty of attempted murder.

On April 4, 2006, Koptsev's lawyer, Vladimir Kirsanov, appealed to Russia's Supreme Court to have his client's sentence reduced, arguing he was mentally unstable, did not kill anyone, and did not cause any disabling injuries. Prosecution lawyers appealed to include the charge of inciting interethnic hatred, which was dropped by the court.

References

External links
Anti-Semitism alarms Russian Jews - BBC News, February 17, 2005
Russian MPs' letter angers Israel - BBC News, January 25, 2005

Living people
Russian criminals
1985 births
Hate crimes
Russian prisoners and detainees
Prisoners and detainees of Russia
Antisemitic attacks and incidents in Europe